Makkal Aatchi is a 1995 Indian Tamil-language political thriller film written by E. Ramdoss, directed by R. K. Selvamani and produced by Thirupur A. Selvaraj under Aarthi International. The film stars Mammootty, Roja and Ranjitha, while Aishwarya, Anandaraj and Livingston play supporting roles. The film's music was composed by Ilaiyaraaja. The film revolves around  Sethupathi, a common man who accidentally finds a stash of money which he then uses to become a politician.

The film was a super hit at the box office even though it clashed with the Rajinikanth starrer Muthu and the Kamal Haasan starrer Kuruthipunal . The film was also a commercial success in Kerala. With consecutive box office successes, the film elevated Mammootty to the status of a Superstar among the Tamil audience.

The film received positive reviews from critics particularly the film's dialogues by Liaquat Ali Khan, which won rave reviews from critics. BehindWoods.com listed Makkal Aatchi in its list of "10 Memorable Political Tamil Films That Made People Think." The movie was dubbed in Malayalam as Ente Naadu following the success of the film in Tamil Nadu.

Premise 
Sethupathi, a common man, gets lucky when he accidentally finds a large amount of money in a truck. He decides to use the money to enter politics and ends up becoming the chief minister of the state.

Cast 
Mammootty as Sethupathi
Roja as Sarasu
Ranjitha as Parvathi
Aishwarya as Manjula (Guest Appearance)
Livingston as Govindasamy
Anandaraj as Rangachari
Mansoor Ali Khan as Valaiyapathi
R. Sundarrajan
Radharavi as Parvathi's father

Soundtrack 
The music was composed by Ilaiyaraaja.

Release 
The film was released on October 23, 1995. The film was dubbed into Malayalam as Ente Naadu. The film was released along Rajinikanth starrer Muthu and the Kamal Haasan starrer Kuruthipunal released at the same time and both clashed at the box office. It was a box office success, completing a 150-day run in theatres.

Critical reception 
Indolink called the film's screenplay and dialogues "quick witted" and "smart". Thulasi of Kalki called it a must watch film.

Legacy 
Behindwoods listed Makkal Aatchi in its list of "10 memorable political Tamil films that made people think."

References

External links 
 

1990s political thriller films
1990s Tamil-language films
1995 films
Films directed by R. K. Selvamani
Films scored by Ilaiyaraaja
Indian political thriller films